Elizabeth Foulis (24 October 1746 – 1827) was a Scottish library benefactor who bequeathed her collection of rare books to the University of St Andrews Library.

Early life
Miss Elizabeth Foulis was born on 24 October 1746, in London, the daughter of Sir James Foulis, 5th Baronet, and his wife Mary. She had two surviving siblings; an older brother, James, the heir presumptive to the baronetcy, and a younger sister, Mary. Her father was an acquaintance of Samuel Johnson, John Boswell and Sir Walter Scott.

Reading habits
In 1808, she donated two shells brought by her father from India to the University of St Andrews, as a result of which she received borrowing rights to the University Library, and evidence of her reading life in St Andrews began. Between 1815 and 1826, she borrowed 412 books, an average of forty-five books a year. In 1820, she borrowed ninety-eight books, often returning multiple times in a week to fetch more volumes. Most student borrowers filled up a single page in the receipt book with their borrowing records, but Elizabeth filled up eight.

Library benefactor
Elizabeth Foulis died in 1827, at the age of eighty-one, and bequeathed her collection of 46 rare books to the St Andrews University Library, many of which are still held in the University Collections.

References

1746 births
1827 deaths